Sadang Station is a station on the Seoul Subway Line 2 and Seoul Subway Line 4 in South Korea.

Sadang Station has one island platform for Line 4 and two side platforms for Line 2. The Line 2 platforms of this station were the first in South Korea to have platform screen doors installed, on October 21, 2005. This station is the southern terminus for Line 4 trains that originate from Jinjeop.

Both platform levels are located in Sadang-dong, Dongjak-gu, Seoul.

Station layout

Passenger load
In a survey conducted in 2011 by the Ministry of Land, Transport and Maritime Affairs on 92 administrative divisions across the country, it reported that Sadang Station is the third-busiest public transit stop following Gangnam Station and Jamsil Station. It is followed by Seolleung Station and Sillim Station.

In December 2010 the station is recorded as having the second-highest WiFi data consumption of all the Seoul Metropolitan Subway stations, following Express Bus Terminal Station and followed by Dongdaemun Station, Jamsil Station and Jongno 3(sam)-ga Station.

References

Seoul Metropolitan Subway stations
Railway stations opened in 1983
Metro stations in Dongjak District
Metro stations in Seocho District
Metro stations in Gwanak District
1983 establishments in South Korea
20th-century architecture in South Korea